Pseudolividae is a taxonomic family of medium-sized sea snails, marine gastropod mollusks in the superfamily Olivoidea.

The family name Pseudolividae is composed of the prefix "pseudo" and the word "Olividae" and thus means false olives. This refers to the fact that some of the species in this group, in particular a few of the Pseudoliva species, have shells that rather closely resemble those of the Olividae, the olives.

Taxonomy
According to the taxonomy of the Gastropoda by Bouchet & Rocroi (2005) the family Pseudolividae has no subfamilies.

Genera 
According to the World Register of Marine Species (WoRMS), the family Pseudolividae contains the following genera :

 Luizia Douvillé, 1933
 Macron H. Adams & A. Adams, 1853
 Naudoliva Kilburn, 1989
 † Popenoeum Squires, 1989 
 Pseudoliva Swainson, 1840
 † Sulcobuccinum d'Orbigny, 1850 
 † Sulcoliva Vermeij, 1998 
 Triumphis Gray, 1857
 Zemira H. Adams & A. Adams, 1853
Genera brought into synonymy
 † Eburnopsis Tate, 1889: synonym of Zemira H. Adams & A. Adams, 1853
 Fulmentum P. Fischer, 1884: synonym of Pseudoliva Swainson, 1840
 Macroniscus Thiele, 1929: synonym of Macron H. Adams & A. Adams, 1853
 Mariona G. B. Sowerby III, 1890: synonym of Pseudoliva Swainson, 1840
 Sylvanocochlis Melvill, 1903: synonym of Fulmentum P. Fischer, 1884

References

 Vermeij G. (1998). Generic revision of the neogastropod family Pseudolividae. The Nautilus 111(2): 53-84
 Bouchet P. & Rocroi J.-P. (2005) Classification and nomenclator of gastropod families. Malacologia 47(1-2): 1–397.

 
Olivoidea
Gastropod families